Bremanger is a village in Bremanger Municipality in Vestland county, Norway.  The village is located along the Bremangerpollen bay on the western side of the Bremangerlandet island.

The village sits along the shore with steep mountains on one side and the ocean on the other.  The lake Dalevatnet sits on the north side of the village.  Bremanger Church is located in the village, serving the western part of the island.  The village has been home to a church since the middle ages.  On the western end of the village lies the Grotlesanden beach area, a picturesque white sand beach.

References

Villages in Vestland
Bremanger